FC Zenit-2 Saint Petersburg is a Russian football team from Saint Petersburg. During the 2017-18 campaign they will be competing in the following competitions: Russian National Football League.

Competitions

Russian National Football League

Results summary

Results by matchday

Matches

References

Russian First League